Following is a List of senators of Corsica, people who have represented the department of Corsica in the Senate of France. The department was divided into Corse-du-Sud and Haute-Corse in 1975.

Third Republic

Senators for Corsica under the French Third Republic were:

Fourth Republic

Senators for Corsica under the French Fourth Republic were:

François Vittori (1946–1948)
Adolphe Landry (1946–1955)
Pierre Romani (1948–1955)
Jean Filippi (1955–1959)
Jean-Paul de Rocca-Serra (1955–1959)

Fifth Republic 

Senators for Corsica under the French Fifth Republic:

Jean-Paul de Rocca-Serra (1959–1962)
Jacques Faggianelli (1959–1962)
Jean Filippi (1962–1975 (end of mandate in 1980)
Francois Giacobbi (1962–1975 (end of mandate in 1980)

References

Sources